Chlorodiloma millelineata is a species of sea snail, a marine gastropod mollusk in the family Trochidae, the top snails.

Description
The height of the shell attains 19 mm, its diameter 21 mm. The thick shell has a very deep umbilicus, nearly reaching to the apex. It is a little shining, yellowish, with elongated flexuous unequal brownish-green spots and dots of the same color. The acute spire is little elevated. The 6 whorls are obliquely striate. The body whorl is very large and contains numerous irregular spiral ridges, stronger and numbering 6 on the base, with obliquely striate interstices. The oblique aperture is rounded, nacreous with greenish reflections and showing the folds inside.

Distribution
This marine species is endemic to Australia and occurs in the Torres Straits and off Queensland.

References

External links
 To Encyclopedia of Life
 To World Register of Marine Species

millelineata
Gastropods of Australia
Gastropods described in 1864